Ramkhiladi Singh Yadav is an Indian politician and a member of the 18th Uttar Pradesh Assembly, represents the Gunnaur constituency of Uttar Pradesh and also has earlier been a member of the Sixteenth Legislative Assembly of Uttar Pradesh, represents the Gunnaur constituency of Uttar Pradesh in India. He is a member of the Samajwadi Party political party.

Early life and  education
Ramkhiladi Singh Yadav was born in Gunnaur. He attended the M. J. P. Rohilkhand University and attained Bachelor of Science (agriculture).

Political career
Ramkhiladi Singh Yadav has been a MLA for three terms. He represented the Gunnaur constituency and is a member of the Samajwadi Party political party.

He lost his seat in the 2017 Uttar Pradesh Assembly election to Ajeet Kumar of the Bharatiya Janata Party.

Posts held

See also
 Eleventh Legislative Assembly of Uttar Pradesh
 Gunnaur (Assembly constituency)
 Sixteenth Legislative Assembly of Uttar Pradesh
 Thirteenth Legislative Assembly of Uttar Pradesh
 Uttar Pradesh Legislative Assembly

Samajwadi Party politicians
Uttar Pradesh MLAs 1991–1993
Uttar Pradesh MLAs 1997–2002
Uttar Pradesh MLAs 2012–2017
People from Sambhal district
1960 births
Living people
Uttar Pradesh MLAs 2022–2027